Follow the Crowd is a 1918 American short comedy film with Harold Lloyd. Previously thought to be a lost film, the SilentEra website says now that a "print exists".  A truncated version (of slightly less than seven minutes), with both English and Spanish intertitles, was posted on YouTube in 2016.  The film's plot has Harold accidentally getting involved with a terrorist group.

Cast
 Harold Lloyd 
 Snub Pollard 
 Bebe Daniels 
 William Blaisdell
 Billy Fay (as B. Fay)
 Helen Gilmore
 Dee Lampton
 Gus Leonard
 Marvin Loback
 James Parrott
 Charles Stevenson
 Dorothea Wolbert

See also
 List of American films of 1918
 Harold Lloyd filmography

References

External links

1918 films
1918 comedy films
1918 short films
Silent American comedy films
American silent short films
American black-and-white films
Films directed by Alfred J. Goulding
1910s rediscovered films
American comedy short films
Rediscovered American films
1910s American films